is a former Japanese football player.

Playing career
Uemoto was born in Ibusuki on June 1, 1982. After graduating from high school, he joined J1 League club Júbilo Iwata in 2001. However he could hardly play in the match in the club have many Japan national team players Hideto Suzuki, Makoto Tanaka and so on. In 2005, he moved to J1 club Oita Trinita. He became a regular player as left back of three backs defense and played many matches for a long time. The club won the champions 2008 J.League Cup first major title in the club history. However the club was relegated to J2 League end of 2009 season and he was released from the club due to their financial problems. In 2010, he moved to J1 club Cerezo Osaka. He played many matches as regular center back with Teruyuki Moniwa. In 2012, he moved to J1 club Vegalta Sendai. He played as regular center back with Jiro Kamata in 2012. However he could not play many matches for injuries from 2013. In 2016, he moved to J2 club V-Varen Nagasaki. However he could hardly play in the match. In 2017, he moved to J3 League club Kagoshima United FC based in his local. He played many matches and retired end of 2017 season.

Club statistics

References

External links

1982 births
Living people
Association football people from Kagoshima Prefecture
Japanese footballers
J1 League players
J2 League players
J3 League players
Júbilo Iwata players
Oita Trinita players
Cerezo Osaka players
Vegalta Sendai players
V-Varen Nagasaki players
Kagoshima United FC players
Association football defenders